Tracy Staab (born October 3, 1963) is a State Judge of the Washington Court of Appeals, Division III.

Biography 

Staab ran for election for the Division III District 1 judge of the Washington Court of Appeals. Staab won in the general election on November 3, 2020.

References 

Living people
Washington Court of Appeals judges
1963 births